Adriana Altaras (born 6 April 1960, Zagreb) is a German actress, theater director and writer, born in Zagreb.

Biography

Early life
Altaras was born in Zagreb, FPR Yugoslavia to Jewish parents, Thea Altaras (née Fuhrmann) and Jakob Altaras, who were part of the Yugoslav Partisans. Her father started to explore the true causes of the death of his brother, Silvio Altaras, who was killed by the communist regime of the Yugoslavia in early 1945. Because of that, in 1964, the League of Communists of Croatia initiated a court case against her father; as a result of this, she escaped Zagreb with her mother to Italy in 1964, in a car driven by her Italian uncle. She stayed with her mother in Italy for a few years, long enough to learn Italian. From Italy, Altaras moved to Konstanz, Germany in 1967.

Career
After high school education, Altaras graduated from the Berlin University of the Arts. Altaras completed her academic studies in New York City. She founded the Western Stadthirschen theater in Berlin, where she worked as an actress, director and writer. However, the focus of her work remained with the various theater projects. She worked as a theater director at the Berliner Ensemble and Neuköllner Opera in Berlin, with her staging of the Vagina monologues, which was shown with different actresses in 2001, becoming a great success. In the cinema, she has mainly acted in films by Rudolf Thome, with whom she had worked since the 1980s. In 1988, she received the Deutscher Filmpreis for her role in Thome's film .

In 1993, Altaras received the Theater Prize of the State of North Rhine-Westphalia. In 1998 she received the Deutscher Filmpreis Award. In 1999, she received the 2nd Audience Award Friedrich Luft, Berlin. In 2000, she received a Silver Bear for acting.

Altaras worked with Steven Spielberg's Shoah Foundation as an interviewer and lecturer. Altaras has two sons with composer Wolfgang Böhmer; Aaron and Leonard Altaras.

She is a regular columnist at the German newspaper Die Zeit Online. Regina Schilling directed the film Tito's Glasses in 2014, based on Altaras's book Titos Brille, in which she travels through her Croatian homeland in search of her family past and fights for the return of stolen property.

Filmography
 1964: Nikoletina Bursać – Director: Branko Bauer
 1982: Dorado (one way) – Director: Reinhard Münster
 1987: In der Wüste – Director: Rafael Fuster Pardo
 1988:  – Director: Rudolf Thome
 1988:  – Director: Rudolf Thome (with Johannes Herrschmann)
 1989:  – Director: Rudolf Thome
 1994: Löwenzahn – Eine dolle Knolle
 1995:  – Director: Rudolf Thome
 1996: Killer Condom – Director: Martin Walz
 1997: Tatort: Gefährliche Übertragung – Director: Petra Haffter (TV series episode)
 1997: Liebe Lügen – Director: Martin Walz
 1999: Apokalypso – Director: Martin Walz
 2000:  – Director: Rudolf Thome
 2003:  – Director: Rudolf Thome
 2003: Tor zum Himmel – Director: Veit Helmer
 2004: Alles auf Zucker! – Director: Dani Levy
 2006:  – Director: Rudolf Thome
 2007: Nur ein kleines bisschen schwanger
 2007: Mein Führer – Die wirklich wahrste Wahrheit über Adolf Hitler – Director: Dani Levy
 2007: Vollidiot – Director: Tobi Baumann
 2007: 
 2007: Pastewka – Season 3 (TV series)
 2009: Die Gräfin
 2009: Germany 09
 2011: Bloch: Inschallah – Director: Thomas Jauch
 2013: Danni Lowinski (TV series)
 2014: Josephine Klick – Allein unter Cops
 2015: Nacht der Angst – Director: Gabriela Zerhau
 2019: Das perfekte Geheimnis – Director: Bora Dagtekin

Works
 Titos Brille, Köln: Kiepenheuer & Witsch, 2011
 Doitscha! Eine jüdische Mutter packt aus, Köln: Kiepenheuer & Witsch, 2015 
 Das Meer und ich waren im besten Alter : Geschichten aus meinem Alltag, Köln: Kiepenheuer & Witsch, 2017. 
 Die jüdische Souffleuse. Kiepenheuer & Witsch, Köln 2018,

References

Bibliography

External links
 Adriana Altaras official website
 Ute Nicolai Berlin

1960 births
Living people
Croatian Jews
Yugoslav emigrants to West Germany
Berlin University of the Arts alumni
German stage actresses
German directors
German women writers
Best Actress German Film Award winners
Altaras family